Too Stuffed to Jump is an album by the Amazing Rhythm Aces, released in 1976.

"The End Is Not in Sight (The Cowboy Tune)" won the 1976 Grammy award in the category Country Vocal Performance by a Group. The song reached #20 on the Canadian country charts and #69 on the pop charts.

In 2000, Too Stuffed to Jump was reissued by the Special Products Division of Sony Music in the USA on a two-for-one CD which also contains the group's debut album Stacked Deck. In 2013, Dave Dimartino of Rolling Stone called the album "near classic" and said that it sounded "more contemporary than anyone might expect."

Track listing
(All tracks written by Russell Smith unless stated)

 "Typical American Boy" 3:30 (Russell Smith, James H. Brown Jr.)
 "If I Just Knew What to Say" 2:08 (Stuart Wright)
 "The End Is Not in Sight (The Cowboy Tune)" 3:46
 "Same Ol' Me" (Butch McDade) 2:25
 "These Dreams of Losing You" 3:30 (Russell Smith, James H. Brown Jr.)
 "I'll Be Gone" 2:56
 "Out of the Snow" 3:40
 "Fool for the Woman" 2:44
 "A Little Italy Rag" 2:22
 "Dancing the Night Away" 5:39 (Russell Smith, James H. Brown Jr.)

References

1976 albums
The Amazing Rhythm Aces albums
ABC Records albums